Weekends in Normandy (original title: Week-ends) is a 2014 French film directed by Anne Villacèque. It stars Karin Viard, Noémie Lvovsky, Jacques Gamblin and Ulrich Tukur.

Cast 
 Karin Viard as Christine
 Noémie Lvovsky as Sylvette
 Jacques Gamblin as Jean
 Ulrich Tukur as Ulrich
 Aurélia Petit as Pascale
 Gisèle Casadesus as Françoise
 Finnegan Oldfield as Erwan
 Laure Calamy as Flo
 Iliana Zabeth as Charlotte
 Jeanne Ruff as Charlotte 2
 César Domboy as Julien
 Philippe Rebbot as The antique dealer

References

External links 
 

2014 films
2014 comedy-drama films
2010s French-language films
French comedy-drama films
Tragicomedy films
2010s French films